is a list of waterfalls  in Japan compiled by the Japanese Ministry of the Environment in 1990.

Background
According to the Japanese government, there are 517 named waterfalls in Japan. Many of these waterfalls are located in remote mountain locations, but with an increase in hiking and tourism in recent years, the number of visitors has greatly increased, placing significant pressure on the surrounding environment.

Listing

Gallery

External links

Must Love Japan
The Best 100 Waterfalls of Japan

W
Japan
Waterfalls
Waterfalls